Steve Durham (born 12 October 1963) is a former professional rugby league footballer who played in the 1980s and 1990s.

Playing career

Club career
During Steve's time with Bramley, he made his debut against Sheffield Eagles on the 28th August 1988 during the 1988-89 season, playing his last game in January 1991, against Workington Town in the 1990-91 season
Steve Durham made his début for Wakefield Trinity during October 1993, and he played his last match for Wakefield Trinity during the 1994–95 season.

References

External links
Stanley Rangers ARLFC - Roll of Honour
(archived by web.archive.org) Statistics at hullfc.com
(archived by web.archive.org) Stats → Past Players → D at hullfc.com (statistics for player surnames beginning with 'C' and 'D' swapped)

1963 births
Living people
Batley Bulldogs players
Bramley RLFC players
English rugby league players
Hull F.C. players
Place of birth missing (living people)
Rugby league props
Wakefield Trinity players